The term mixed-blood in the United States and Canada has historically been described as people of multiracial backgrounds, in particular mixed European and Native American ancestry. Today, the term is often seen as pejorative.

Northern Woodlands and Subarctic 
Some of the most prominent in the 19th century were "mixed-blood" or mixed-race descendants of fur traders and Native American women along the northern frontier. The fur traders tended to be men of social standing and they often married or had relationships with daughters of Native American chiefs, consolidating social standing on both sides. They held high economic status of what was for years in the 18th and 19th centuries a two-tier society at settlements at trading posts, with other Europeans, American Indians, and mixed-blood workers below them. Mixed-blood is also used occasionally in Canadian accounts to refer to the 19th century Anglo-Métis population rather than Métis, which referred to a specific cultural group of people of First Nations and French descent, with their own language, Michif.

Southeastern Woodlands 
Similarly in the Southeast Woodlands, tribes began having inter-generational marriage and sexual relationships with the Europeans in the early 1700s. Many Cherokee bands and families were quick to see the economic benefits of having trade, land and business dealings with Europeans, strengthened through marriages. Prominent Cherokee and Creek leaders of the 19th century were of mixed-descent but, born to Indian mothers in matrilineal kinship societies, they identified fully and were accepted as Indian and grew up in those cultures.

Notable examples 
Renowned persons of mixed-blood ancestry in United States' history are many. One such example is Jean Baptiste Charbonneau, who guided the Mormon Battalion from New Mexico to the city of San Diego in California in 1846 and then accepted an appointment there as alcalde of Mission San Luis Rey. Both his parents worked with the Lewis and Clark Expedition, his mother Sacagawea as the invaluable Shoshone guide and his French-Canadian father Toussaint Charbonneau as an interpreter of Shoshone and Hidatsa, cook and laborer.  J.B. Charbonneau is depicted on the United States dollar coin along with his mother Sacagawea.

Another example is Jane Johnston Schoolcraft, inducted into the Michigan Women's Hall of Fame in 2008, in recognition of her literary contributions.  She is recognized as the first Native American literary writer and poet, and the first Native American poet to write in an indigenous language.  Jane Johnston was the daughter of a wealthy Scots-Irish fur trader and his Ojibwe wife, who was daughter of an Ojibwe chief. Johnston Schoolcraft was born in 1800 and lived most of her life in Sault Ste. Marie, Michigan, where she grew up in both cultures and learned French, English and Ojibwe. She wrote in English and Ojibwe. She married Henry Rowe Schoolcraft, who became a renowned ethnographer, in part due to her and her family's introduction to Native American culture. A major collection of her writings was published in 2007.

In United States historiography, Republican and Democratic partisan debates over the antebellum extension of citizenship to "persons of mixed Indian blood" in western state constitutional conventions may or may not recalibrate research aims. The consequences of ratified constitutional articles on commerce and labor for public policy and, to a lesser degree, burgeoning western state and/or federal litigation, remain fruitful avenues for further research. The violent vectors of "free soil" ideas impacted Anglo-American and Native American cultures, already buffeted by wage labor systems. This violence, symbolic or otherwise, interfaced with non-dichotomous notions of kinship and (related) Anglo-American lexical glosses of Native American cultural expression in treaties of friendship. Such treaties featured seventeenth- and eighteenth-century interpretive applications of ius gentium, the Roman law of nations, and infrequently appeared in the antebellum period. Newspapers and southern secession, the (a)politics of slavery, and the (a)politics of Native America would be crucial for a sociopolitical lens. Contemporary energy policy, technology, and notions of Native American sovereignties in post-(neo)apartheid indigenous worlds converge, and then intersect with, community criteria in landscapes of power. These green politics rest on earlier precedents, such as the consequences of Grand Coulee Dam construction and 1950s scholarly debates over indigenous territoriality in American Society for Ethnohistory member testimony.

Mestizo 
Mestizo is the contemporary term for Hispanic individuals (whether US-born or immigrant) of a similar mixed ancestry (Indigenous and European), but based on different groups. Many Hispanic Americans who have identified as "white" are of Spanish descent, having had ancestors in the Southwestern United States for several generations prior to annexation of that region into the United States. However, identification on the US Census has historically been limited by its terminology and the option to only select one "race" in the past. Others have classified themselves as mestizo, particularly those who also identify as Chicano. Hispanics of Puerto Rican and Cuban descent are most numerous on the East Coast, especially in Florida, New York and New England.

The most recent Hispanic immigrants, who arrived during mid-century until today, have mainly identified as mestizo or Amerindian. They have come from Mexico, Central and North South America. Of the over 35 million Hispanics counted in the Federal 2000 Census, the overwhelming majority of the 42.2% who identified as "some other race" are believed to be mestizos—a term not included on the US Census but widely used in Latin America. Of the 47.9% of Hispanics who identified as "White Hispanic", many acknowledge possessing Amerindian ancestry, as do many European Americans who identify as "White". Hispanics identifying as multiracial amounted to 6.3% (2.2 million) of all Hispanics; they likely included many mestizos as well as individuals of mixed Amerindian and African ancestry.

See also
 Baster
 Half-breed
 Half-caste
 Luk khrueng
 Marabou
 Mestizo
 Multiracial
 Quadroon

Notes

References 
 Journals of Lewis and Clark
 Colby, Susan (2005).  Sacagawea's Child: The Life and Times of Jean-Baptiste (Pomp) Charbonneau. Spokane: Arthur H. Clarke.
 Kartunnen, Frances (1994). Between Worlds: Interpreters, Guides, and Survivors. Rutgers: Rutgers University Press.
 
 Robert Dale Parker, ed., The Sound the Stars Make Rushing Through the Sky: The Writings of Jane Johnston Schoolcraft, Philadelphia: University of Pennsylvania Press, 2007
 Mary M. June, "British Period - Sault Ste. Marie Timeline and History", Bayliss Public Library, Bayliss, Michigan, 2000

External links
 Dave Stanaway and Susan Askwith, CD: John Johnston: His Life and Times in the Fur Trade Era, Borderland Records.

Ethnic groups in North America
 
Multiracial affairs